David Joseph Carpenter (born May 6, 1930), a.k.a. The Trailside Killer, is an American serial killer and serial rapist known for stalking and murdering a variety of individuals on hiking trails in state parks near San Francisco, California. He attacked at least ten individuals, with two attempted victims, Steven Haertle and Lois Rinna (mother of television personality Lisa Rinna) surviving. Carpenter used a .38 caliber handgun in all but one of the killings; a .44 caliber handgun was used in the killing of Edda Kane on Mount Tamalpais.

Early life
David Carpenter, a native of San Francisco, was physically abused as a child by his alcoholic father and domineering mother. As a boy he had a severe stutter, a persistent bed-wetting problem and exhibited cruelty to animals. At age 13, Carpenter was incarcerated for molesting two of his cousins.

Crimes

Carpenter’s first attempted murder occurred in 1960, for which he spent seven years in prison. This was committed against Lois Rinna, the mother of future television personality Lisa Rinna. He was arrested for kidnapping in 1970 and spent another seven years behind bars. After his release, Carpenter became a suspect in the Zodiac murders, although he was eventually cleared.

From 1979 to 1981, Carpenter raped and murdered five women in Santa Cruz County and Marin County. On May 10, 1988, a San Diego jury convicted him on five counts of first-degree murder in the deaths of Richard Stowers, Cynthia Moreland, Shauna May, Diane O'Connell, and Anne Alderson. He also was found guilty of raping two of the women and attempting to rape a third. Carpenter was sentenced to die in the gas chamber and remains on death row in San Quentin State Prison.

Following his conviction for the Marin County murders, Carpenter was tried, and subsequently convicted, by a Santa Cruz jury for the murders of Ellen Hansen and Heather Scaggs. The same jury also found him guilty of the attempted murder of Hansen's hiking companion, Steven Haertle; the attempted rape of Hansen; and the rape of Scaggs. Hansen, who was a University of California-Davis student, has a memorial scholarship created in honor of her courage during the attack, which allowed Haertle to escape alive. In 1995, the Santa Cruz convictions were overturned due to juror misconduct. The California Supreme Court later reinstated the Santa Cruz convictions.

In December 2009, the San Francisco Police Department reexamined evidence from October 21, 1979, murder of Mary Frances Bennett, who was jogging at Lands End when she was attacked and stabbed to death. A DNA sample obtained from the evidence was matched to Carpenter through state Department of Justice files. In February 2010, police confirmed the match with a recently obtained sample from Carpenter. Carpenter is still a suspect in the murders of Edda Kane and Barbara Schwartz.

In popular culture
The Trailside killings provide the context for Joyce Maynard's 2013 novel After Her. On television, both The New Detectives and Born to Kill? made an episode about the case.

See also 
 List of death row inmates in the United States
 List of serial killers by number of victims
 List of serial killers in the United States

References

Sources
Schechter, Harold (2003), The Serial Killer Files: The Who, What, Where, How, and Why of the World's Most Terrifying Murderers, Ballantine Books,

Further reading
Graysmith, Robert (April 3, 1991), The Sleeping Lady: The Trailside Murders Above the Golden Gate, Onyx, 

1930 births
1960 crimes in the United States
1979 murders in the United States
20th-century American criminals
American male criminals
American people convicted of attempted murder
American people convicted of attempted rape
American people convicted of kidnapping
American people convicted of murder
American people convicted of rape
American people convicted of robbery
American prisoners sentenced to death
American rapists
American serial killers
Criminals from California
Criminals of the San Francisco Bay Area
Living people
Male serial killers
Murder in the San Francisco Bay Area
People from San Francisco
People convicted of murder by California
Prisoners sentenced to death by California
Violence against women in the United States